The 2014 Philadelphia Union season is the club's fifth season of existence, competing in Major League Soccer, the top flight of American soccer. The club was initially managed by John Hackworth, in his third season (second full season) with the club. In June, Hackworth was fired from his role as head coach and assistant coach Jim Curtin was promoted on an interim basis. At the conclusion of the season, Curtin was officially made permanent head coach, making him the third head coach in the club's history. The 2014 season marked the first time the Union reached a competition finals, finishing runners-up in the 2014 U.S. Open Cup to Seattle Sounders FC.

Background

Roster

As of April 20, 2014.

Competitions

Preseason

MLS

U.S. Open Cup

Friendlies

Results summary

Coaching staff

Statistics

Appearances and goals

Transfers

In

Out

Loan in

Loan out

See also 
 Philadelphia Union
 2014 in American soccer
 2014 Major League Soccer season

References 

Philadelphia Union seasons
Philadelphia Union
Philadelphia Union
2014 in sports in Pennsylvania